Titanoptilus is a genus of moths in the family Pterophoridae. It was described by George Hampson in 1905.

Species
Titanoptilus melanodonta Hampson, 1905 (type)
Titanoptilus procerus Bigot, 1969
Titanoptilus rufus Gibeaux, 1994
Titanoptilus serrulatus Meyrick, 1935
Titanoptilus stenodactylus (T. B. Fletcher, 1911) (=Titanoptilus laniger Bigot, 1969 and Titanoptilus patellatus Meyrick, 1913)

References

Pterophorinae
Moth genera
Taxa named by George Hampson